Lucy Colgate Newell (29 September 1906 – 22 May 1987) was an Australian artist noted for painting and textile printing.

Biography 
Newell was born in 1906 in Castlemaine, Victoria to artist Alice Newell and her husband Lt. Colonel Francis Sargent Newell, a solicitor. She was educated at St Catherine's School and took Saturday morning art classes at Castlemaine Technical School with Miss Naples. She later did classes in watercolour painting one afternoon a week with Miss Ethel Crook of Bendigo. Newell studied at the National Gallery School for five years under Bernard Hall but found she didn't much enjoy portraiture or oil painting,  and instead took up textile printing with linocut on cotton fabric.

Her mother Alice was a co-founder of the Castlemaine Art Gallery with whom Newell later exhibited in 1971 and hold her artwork in their collection. She also has work in the National Gallery of Australia's collection and at Buda Historic Home & Garden.

Newell briefly had to give up artistic pursuits to care for her elderly parents, but spent ten years in Woodend creating work she wanted to do. She died there on 22 May 1987.

References

External links 
Lucy Newell: Australian art and artists file, State Library Victoria
Works by Lucy Newell in State Library Victoria collection

1906 births
1987 deaths
Australian artists
Australian painters
Australian textile artists
People from Castlemaine, Victoria
Artists from Victoria (Australia)
People educated at St Catherine's School, Melbourne
National Gallery of Victoria Art School alumni